147 Squadron may refer to:

 147 Squadron (Israel)
 No. 147 Squadron RCAF, Canada
 No. 147 Squadron RAF, United Kingdom
 147th Aero Squadron, United States Army Air Service
 147th Air Refueling Squadron, United States Air Force
 147th Air Support Operations Squadron, United States Air Force
 147th Combat Communications Squadron, United States Air Force
 VFA-147, United States Navy